Gozaar - meaning "transition" – is a Persian-English web-portal devoted to democracy and human rights in Iran. Recognizing that open access to ideas and information is the cornerstone of the quest for freedom, Gozaar seeks to help Iranian democrats fulfill the universal aspiration for justice by creating an accessible, inclusive and provocative space for the discussion of liberty. The journal is dedicated to the women and men in Iran working to improve human rights and democratic practices in their country.

Gozaar seeks to build bridges between democrats inside and outside Iran by fostering dialogue on Iran’s transition to a free society. Gozaar invites everyone interested in a free Iran to write for the journal, especially democrats living in Iran. Gozaar solicits various types of original contributions, such as commentaries, feature articles, reviews, interviews, cartoons and satire pieces. Contributors work on a free-lance basis.

History 
Gozaar was launched by Freedom House as a monthly journal and a collection of resources in September 2006.  Seventeen issues of the journal were published, each dedicated to a new and important theme, such as rights of women, ethnic and religious minorities, children, workers, and students as well as rule of law, stewardship of natural and cultural resources, and transparency in government. In January 2008, Gozaar transitioned to a new format which facilitates dynamic discussion on human rights and democracy issues and showcases new and existing resources and for civic education and activism.

Articles 
Gozaar and its contributors have published hundreds of articles on a spectrum of important themes including the rights of women, children, ethnic and religious minorities, workers, and students as well as the importance of rule of law, an independent judiciary, transparency and accountability in government, and the stewardship of natural and cultural resources. Gozaar has published dozens of interviews of prominent Iranian thinkers and activists and experts on democracy and human rights issues, including Nobel Laureate Shirin Ebadi, national poet Simin Behbehani, student movement leader Abdollah Momeni, and reformist press freedom advocate Eisa Saharkhiz, among others.

Gozaar includes commentary pieces on issues of democracy and human rights in Iran. Gozaar also incorporates articles and reviews of Iranian art, film, and literature, as well as satire and cartoons available only in Persian, though the language of art is universal.

Civic dictionary 
Gozaar’s Persian/English web-based dictionary of key civic terms offers accessible language in both English and Persian designed to foster language learning and use by school children.  The dictionary helps Iranians gain political literacy and engage more easily in global communication about democracy and political development.

Democracy classics 
The Gozaar website includes speeches by leaders who have advanced the cause of freedom and human rights in the world, as well as analysis by experts and shared experiences of human rights activists.  It also includes translations in English and Persian of classics on democracy and liberal values, such as the writing of Nelson Mandela, Martin Luther King Jr., Aung San Suu Kyi, and Anwar Ibrahim.

Legal texts, advocacy materials and manuals 
Gozaar maintains a collection of international legal texts and international conventions and treaties, which are available in both English and Persian. Iran’s quest for justice and rule of law can be greatly enhanced through access to key international legal instruments.  Unlike the Arab Middle East, Iran does not benefit from having UN documents available in its native language.  Human rights defenders, legal scholars, and students of law must be able to read English if they are to benefit from legal texts and advocacy materials developed to help human rights advocates lobby at international fora.  Such texts include The United Nations Convention on the Rights of the Child and the Cairo Declaration on Human Rights in Islam.  Similarly, Gozaar has translated into Persian manuals and tools for the effective defense of human rights and activism published by other organizations which support human rights in Iran and globally.

Blogestan 
Gozaar’s Blogestan highlights five blogs every week. Readers can find a list of active blogs that shed light on issues faced by the Iranians. Most of the blogs are by Iranians, both inside and outside of Iran, though some other blogs that provide interesting commentary on civil society are also highlighted.  Gozaar recognizes bloggers’ efforts and hopes to facilitate discussion on civil society and provide a better understanding of the lives and challenges of Iranians around the world.

Discussion forum 
The Gozaar website also includes a discussion forum to share and discuss reactions, experiences, frustrations, and ideas on issues raised in Gozaar and in readers’ own lives.  Readers can post anonymously or complete a simple registration to participate in a free, lively debate with others.

Notes

Official links
 Gozaar
 Freedom House

See also 
 Freedom House
 Human rights in Iran
 Defenders of Human Rights Center

Human rights in Iran
Human rights journals
Mass media in Iran
Anonymous bloggers